Discovery 3 may refer to:

 Land Rover Discovery 3, a second-generation Discovery SUV car model by Land Rover.
 Lunar Prospector, the third mission of the Discovery program.